The White House in Casa Grande in Pinal County, Arizona is a Tudor Revival house built c. 1929.  It was listed on the National Register of Historic Places in 1985.

It was noted to be the best example in Casa Grande of a Tudor Period Revival House.  It was the home of J.W. White, a long-time resident who had an electrical company in Casa Grande.

See also 
List of historic properties in Casa Grande, Arizona

References

Houses on the National Register of Historic Places in Arizona
Houses completed in 1929
Houses in Pinal County, Arizona
National Register of Historic Places in Pinal County, Arizona
Buildings and structures in Casa Grande, Arizona